Dr. Richárd Tarnai (born 3 November 1972) is a Hungarian jurist and politician, member of the National Assembly (MP) for Kispest (Budapest Constituency XXVIII) between 2010 and 2014. He served as one of the recorders of the parliament from 14 May 2010 until 21 February 2011, when he was appointed Director of the Government Office of Pest County.

References

1972 births
Living people
Eötvös Loránd University alumni
Hungarian jurists
Christian Democratic People's Party (Hungary) politicians
Members of the National Assembly of Hungary (2010–2014)
Politicians from Budapest